Chilopionea is a genus of moths of the family Crambidae. It contains only one species, Chilopionea postcuneifera, which is found in Peru.

References

Pyraustinae
Crambidae genera
Taxa named by Eugene G. Munroe
Monotypic moth genera